Bad Decisions is the fifth studio album by American hard rock band The Last Vegas, released on August 28, 2012, on FrostByte Media label.

Singles
The first single from the album was "Other Side" on November 3, 2011.
The second single from the album was "Evil Eyes" on July 11, 2012.
The third single from the album was "She's My Confusion" on May 28, 2013.

Track listing

Bonus tracks
"Waste Your Time" (ITunes Bonus Track)

Personnel
Chad Cherry – lead vocals
Adam Arling – guitar
Johnny Wator – guitar
Danny Smash – bass
Nate Arling – drums, percussion

Additional musicians
Ashley Wolf - vocals (5)
John San Juan - synthesizers and keyboards (1,6)

References

External links
http://www.sleazeroxx.com/bands/lastvegas/baddecisions.shtml

2012 albums
The Last Vegas albums
Albums produced by Johnny K